Annapolis High School may refer to:

In the United States 
 Annapolis High School (Maryland) in Annapolis, Maryland
 Annapolis High School (Michigan) in Dearborn Heights, Michigan